Chamaechaenactis, common name fullstem, is a genus of flowering plants in the daisy family.

There is only one known species, Chamaechaenactis scaposa, native to the western United States (Colorado, New Mexico, Texas, Wyoming, Arizona, Utah) It is a perennial up to 10 cm (4 inches) tall with a thick underground caudex. Most of the leaves are in a basal rosette. Flower heads are usually produced one at a time, with white to pink disc florets but no ray florets.

References

External links
Southwest Colorado Wildflowers

Bahieae
Monotypic Asteraceae genera
Flora of the Western United States